Neospades is a genus of beetles in the family Buprestidae, the jewel beetles. There are 11 species, all native to Australia.

Species include:

 Neospades chrysopygius (Germer, 1848)
 Neospades cruciatus (Fabricius, 1775)
 Neospades cupricaudus Carter, 1927
 Neospades cupriferus (Gestro, 1877)
 Neospades lateralis Blackburn, 1888
 Neospades nigroaeneus (Kerremans, 1898)
 Neospades pictus Carter, 1923
 Neospades rugiceps (Thomson, 1879)
 Neospades simplex Blackburn, 1888
 Neospades terrareginae (Obenberger, 1919)
 Neospades viridis (Kerremans, 1898)

References

Buprestidae genera
Beetles of Australia